Sir William Robertson Academy (formerly Sir William Robertson High School) is a coeducational secondary school of around 890 pupils, situated in Welbourn, near Lincoln, Lincolnshire, England. The school is sited on a former WWII munitions dump for the nearby Wellingore Aerodrome.

Sir William Robertson Academy is named after Field Marshal William Robertson, born in Welbourn, who served in the First World War.

The school used to specialise languages and taught French, Spanish and German, but now only French is taught. From September 2012 the school has catered for students aged 11 to 18. The school also achieved its best ever GCSE results in 2008.

The school has four houses, each with a differently coloured tie: Simla (yellow), Dragoon (red), Chitral (blue) and Lancer (green). These are named after experiences in Sir William Robertson's life.

Educational institutions established in 1965
Secondary schools in Lincolnshire
1965 establishments in England
Academies in Lincolnshire